Giorgi Gugava (born 1 July 1974) is a Georgian politician who is a member of the Georgian Labour Party. He was a member of the Parliament of Georgia, and took part in the 2017 Georgian local elections where he was a candidate in the Tbilisi mayoral election.

References

Living people
1974 births
Georgian Labour Party politicians
Place of birth missing (living people)
21st-century politicians from Georgia (country)